Priscilla Serina Johanna Isaacs is a South African politician serving as a Member of the Northern Cape Provincial Legislature for the Democratic Alliance (DA). She took office as a Member on 22 May 2019. Isaacs was a PR councillor of the Dawid Kruiper Local Municipality, prior to her election to the provincial legislature.

In 2020, Isaacs declared her candidacy for DA deputy provincial chairperson. The provincial congress was held on 5 December 2020, and she was elected.

References

External links
Priscilla Serina Johanna Isaacs – People's Assembly
Profile : Ms Ms Priscilla Serina Johanna Issacs – Northern Cape Provincial Legislature (NCPL)

Living people
Year of birth missing (living people)
Democratic Alliance (South Africa) politicians
Members of the Northern Cape Provincial Legislature
Women members of provincial legislatures of South Africa
Coloured South African people